Julie Schmitt (6 April 1913 – 10 December 2002) was a German gymnast who competed in the 1936 Summer Olympics. In 1936 she won the gold medal as member of the German gymnastics team.

References

1913 births
2002 deaths
German female artistic gymnasts
Olympic gymnasts of Germany
Gymnasts at the 1936 Summer Olympics
Olympic gold medalists for Germany
Olympic medalists in gymnastics
Medalists at the 1936 Summer Olympics
20th-century German women
21st-century German women